Females is the 2019 debut book by writer Andrea Long Chu. The book is a work of gender theory, literary and film criticism and memoir centered on the premise that "everyone is female and everyone hates it." Femaleness in the book is described as a state of self-sacrifice to make room for the desire of others. The book argues desire is a central part of gender for both transgender and cisgender people.  The book was inspired by the writing of controversial feminist Valerie Solanas and each chapter of Females begins with quotes from Solanas' play Up Your Ass.

References

2019 debut works
2010s LGBT literature
Gender studies books
Transgender studies
Transgender non-fiction books
2019 non-fiction books
Verso Books books
LGBT literature in the United States